Abecassis or Abécassis or Abecasis is a Sephardic patronymic most commonly found among Moroccan Jews.

Notable people with the surname include:

 Eliette Abécassis (born 1969), French writer
 Eryck Abecassis (born 1956), French composer and musician
 George Abecassis (1913–1991), English race driver
 Gonçalo Abecasis (born 1976), Portuguese genetic epidemiologist
 Ricardo Abecassis Espírito Santo Silva, Portuguese financier and former Board Member at Banco Esp%C3%ADrito Santo
 Yael Abecassis (born 1967), Israeli actress

Maghrebi Jewish surnames
Surnames of Moroccan origin
Sephardic surnames